"Bring Flowers of the Rarest" (also known as the Fairest) is a Marian hymn written by Mary E. Walsh.  It was published as the "Crowning Hymn" in the Wreath of Mary 1871/1883 and later in St. Basil's Hymnal (1889). The hymn is frequently sung during a May Crowning service, one of several May devotions to the Blessed Virgin Mary.

Text
1. Bring flowers of the rarest
bring blossoms the fairest,
from garden and woodland and hillside and dale;
our full hearts are swelling,
our glad voices telling
the praise of the loveliest flower of the vale!

refrain: O Mary! we crown thee with blossoms today,
Queen of the Angels, Queen of the May,
O Mary! we crown thee with blossoms today,
Queen of the Angels, Queen of the May.

2. Our voices ascending,
In harmony blending,
Oh! Thus may our hearts turn
Dear Mother, to thee;
Oh! Thus shall we prove thee
How truly we love thee,
How dark without Mary
Life's journey would be.

refrain

3. O Virgin most tender,
Our homage we render,
Thy love and protection,
Sweet Mother, to win;
In danger defend us,
In sorrow befriend us,
And shield our hearts
From contagion and sin.

refrain

4. Of Mothers the dearest,
Oh, wilt thou be nearest,
When life with temptation
Is darkly replete?
Forsake us, O never!
Our hearts be they ever
As Pure as the lilies
We lay at thy feet.

refrain

Publication
Sisters of Notre Dame (1883). Wreath of Mary [music] A collection of hymns to the Blessed Virgin. Boston, Oliver Ditson.
St. Michael's College (1889). St. Basil's hymnal. Toronto: St. Michael's college., Toronto, Ontario.

References

Marian hymns